Samar is an island in the Visayas group in the Philippines.

Samar may also refer to:

People
Samar (name)

Places
In the Philippines
Samar (historical province), a former province (1768-1965) largely coterminous within the island of Samar comprising what are now the present-day provinces of (Western) Samar, Northern Samar and Eastern Samar
 Samar (province), formerly Western Samar, a province of the Philippines that occupies the western three-quarters of the island of Samar
 Northern Samar province
 Eastern Samar province
 Samar Sea, within the Philippine archipelago

In Israel
 Samar, Israel, kibutz in the Arabah Valley, south Israel

Film and television
 Samar (1962 film), an American/Philippine film
 Samar (1999 film), a Hindi/Urdu film
 Samar (2013 film), an Indian Tamil film

Others
 Samar (yacht), one of longest motor yachts
Samar cobra (Naja samarensis)
Samar, an abbreviation for samal rishon, the staff sergeant-equivalent Israeli military rank
Šamar, 2003 album by the Croatian punk rock band Hladno Pivo

See also
Battle off Samar, central action of the Battle of Leyte Gulf at Samar Island during World War II
 Sama (disambiguation)
Samara (disambiguation)
Samaria (disambiguation)